Soveyreh is a village in Khuzestan Province, Iran.

Soveyreh may also refer to:
 Hashcheh-ye Olya
 Sadeyreh-ye Olya
 Sadeyreh-ye Sofla